L'Aiòli was a Provençal newspaper founded by Frédéric Mistral in 1891 to defend and promote Occitan languages and literature, as part of the Félibrige movement. The name comes from a famous Provençal dish, aïoli.

It was published in Avignon and published three issues monthly.

It closed in 1899 after a total of 324 issues had been published.

Notes

Defunct newspapers published in France
Provençal language
Occitan-language mass media
Newspapers established in 1891
Publications disestablished in 1899
Mass media in Avignon
Frédéric Mistral